The 1986 Nabisco Dinah Shore was a women's professional golf tournament, held April 3–6 at Mission Hills Country Club in Rancho Mirage, California. This was the 15th edition of the Nabisco Dinah Shore, and the fourth as a major championship.

Pat Bradley won the fourth of her six major titles, two strokes ahead of runner-up Val Skinner. Bradley held the 54-hole lead, three strokes ahead of 1984 champion Juli Inkster. Defending champion Alice Miller finished 22 strokes back, in a tie for 54th place. 

Bradley won three of the four majors in 1986, narrowly missing the grand slam with a fifth place in the U.S. Women's Open.

Final leaderboard
Sunday, April 6, 1986

Source:

References

External links
Golf Observer leaderboard

Chevron Championship
Golf in California
Nabisco Dinah Shore
Nabisco Dinah Shore
Nabisco Dinah Shore
Nabisco Dinah Shore
Women's sports in California